Francisco Beltrão Futebol Clube, commonly known as Francisco Beltrão, is a Brazilian football club based in Francisco Beltrão, Paraná state.

History
The club was founded on January 4, 1993. They won the Campeonato Paranaense Second Level in 2000 and in 2002.

Achievements
 Campeonato Paranaense Second Level:
 Winners (2): 2000, 2002

Stadium

Francisco Beltrão Futebol Clube play their home games at Estádio Anilado. The stadium has a maximum capacity of 12,000 people.

References

Association football clubs established in 1993
Football clubs in Paraná (state)
1993 establishments in Brazil
Francisco Beltrão